= Women and Gender Development Policy =

The Women and Gender Development Policy is a national policy of the government of Tanzania aimed at promoting gender equality and women's empowerment. The policy provides a framework for integrating gender perspectives into national and sectoral development plans and strategies.

== Background ==
In 2000, the Ministry of Community Development, Women's Affairs and Children formulated the Women and Gender Development Policy. The policy was a step in translating the country's constitutional principles and international commitments into a national strategy. A new, revised policy was approved in 2023 and officially launched in March 2024 to address more contemporary gender issues.
